Sir John Shelley, 5th Baronet (1730 – 11 September 1783), of Michelgrove in Sussex, was a British politician who sat in the House of Commons from 1751 to 1780.

He was the eldest son of Sir John Shelley, 4th Baronet and Margaret Pelham, two of whose brothers (Henry Pelham and The Duke of Newcastle) served as British Prime Minister. He entered Parliament at a by-election in 1751, probably at the first opportunity once he was legally old enough to do so, as Member of Parliament for East Retford, a pocket borough owned by his uncle Newcastle; the vacancy arose from the appointment of the sitting MP as a Commissioner of the Excise, quite possibly with the specific intention of freeing the seat for Shelley. He represented this constituency until 1768 when, having fallen out with Newcastle, he moved to represent nearby Newark (which had once also been under Newcastle's control but now belonged to another of Newcastle's nephews, the Earl of Lincoln, who had also quarrelled with his uncle). He was later also MP for New Shoreham.

In 1755, on the recommendation of Newcastle (who had become Prime Minister on his brother's death the previous year), Shelley was appointed to the desirable sinecure-for-life of Keeper of the Records of the Tower of London, worth £420 a year. In 1757 he acquired another lucrative post, Clerk of the Pipe, and in 1766 he became Treasurer of His Majesty's Household and was appointed to the Privy Council.

Shelley succeeded to the baronetcy on his father's death on 5 September 1771, taking possession of Michelgrove, Sussex. He married Wilhelmina Newnham (died 1772), daughter of John Newnham of Maresfield Park, by whom he had a son, John, who succeeded him. After the death of his first wife, he married again, to Elizabeth Woodcock, and they had three daughters.

He retired from Parliament in 1780, and died in 1783.

References

 Robert Beatson, "A Chronological Register of Both Houses of Parliament" (London: Longman, Hurst, Res & Orme, 1807) 
 Shelley genealogy
 

|-

1730 births
1783 deaths
Members of the Parliament of Great Britain for English constituencies
British MPs 1747–1754
British MPs 1754–1761
British MPs 1761–1768
British MPs 1768–1774
British MPs 1774–1780
Treasurers of the Household
Shelley baronets, of Michelgrove